Here Comes the Bride is the fourth studio album by the American rock band Spin Doctors, released in 1999.

Track listing

Personnel
Spin Doctors
 Chris Barron – lead vocals
 Eran Tabib – guitar
 Mark White - bass on tracks 3–5, 8, 12 and 13
 Aaron Comess – drums, keyboards, bass on tracks 1, 2, 6, 7, 9–11, 14 and 15
 Ivan Neville – keyboards, backing vocals

Additional musicians
 Joe Bonadio – tambourine, hand drums
 Lani Groves – backing vocals
 Todd Horton – trumpet
 Arnie Lawrence – saxophone
 Andrew Lippman – trombone
 Catherine Russell – backing vocals
 Judith Talvi – cello

Production
Producer: Aaron Comess
Engineers: Peter Denenberg, Tom Fritze
Mixing: Aaron Comess, Peter Denenberg
Mastering: Ted Jensen

References

Spin Doctors albums
1999 albums